The women's 200m Butterfly event at the 2006 Central American and Caribbean Games occurred on Thursday, July 20, 2006, at the S.U. Pedro de Heredia Aquatic Complex in Cartagena, Colombia.

Records at the time of the event were:
World Record: 2:05.61, Otylia Jędrzejczak (Poland), Montreal, Canada, July 28, 2005.
Games Record: 2:17.00, Meliza Mata (Costa Rica), 1998 Games in Maracaibo (Aug.14.1998).

Results

Final

Preliminaries

References

Results: 2006 CACs--Swimming: Women's 200 Butterfly--prelims from the official website of the 2006 Central American and Caribbean Games; retrieved 2009-07-10.
Results: 2006 CACs--Swimming: Women's 200 Butterfly--finals from the official website of the 2006 Central American and Caribbean Games; retrieved 2009-07-10.

Butterfly, Women's 200m
2006 in women's swimming